The women's 800 metres event at the 2015 African Games was held on 13 and 15 September.

Medalists

Results

Heats
Qualification: First 2 in each heat (Q) and the next 2 fastest (q) advanced to the final.

Final

References

800
2015 in women's athletics